The Edwin S. George Building, built in 1908, is located at 4612 Woodward Avenue in Midtown Detroit, Michigan, at the corner of Woodward and Garfield. In 1914, the name was changed to the Garfield Building. It was listed on the National Register of Historic Places in 1993.

History
Edwin S. George was an important businessman in Detroit at the turn of the 20th century. He first came to Detroit in 1890 and worked as a furrier, opening his own wholesale and retail fur company in 1897. He became involved in Detroit's automobile industry and was an important developer of the stretch of Woodward between Grand Circus Park and Warren Avenue.

In 1908, George hired architect Albert Kahn to design a two-story building which would include rental space for auto parts suppliers and manufacturers. This building opened as the Edwin S. George Building. In 1914, George had three additional floors added to the building (also designed by Kahn) and changed the name to the Garfield building. George owned the building until 1942, when he sold it to a real estate investment firm. Wayne County Community College used the Garfield Building in the 1970s. The building was converted to condominiums in 2000, and became known as the Lofts at Garfield.

Architecture
The original Edwin S. George Building was a two-story square building with a flat roof, with a white glazed terra cotta facade. Embellishments were added to make the building attractive. The additional three floors added in 1914 are architecturally consistent with the lower floors.

References

External links

Garfield Building from the City of Detroit Planning and Development Department.
The Lofts at Garfield from Model D.

Commercial buildings on the National Register of Historic Places in Michigan
Buildings and structures completed in 1908
National Register of Historic Places in Detroit
Historic district contributing properties in Michigan
1908 establishments in Michigan
Albert Kahn (architect) buildings